The Ship's Piano is a studio album by British singer-songwriter Darren Hayman. It was released by Fortuna Pop! in 2011.

A French piano built in 1933 is the only instrument employed on the album.

Critical reception
Drowned in Sound wrote that "if [Hayman]'s not yet unanimously considered the greatest cardigan-stylee speccy-sporting dweeby loser type songwriter-man of recent decades, he's surely on his miserable, merry way.

Track listing
 "I Taught You How To Dance" – 3:23
 "Old House" – 4:44
 "Cuckoo" – 3:59
 "It's Easy to Hang With You" – 5:43
 "Know Your Place" – 1:06
 "Take a Breather" – 5:53
 "Clown Sky" – 3:31
 "No Children" – 4:31
 "Oh Josephine" – 6:39
 "Think It Through" – 3:44
 "The Ship's Piano" – 3:47

References

2011 albums
Darren Hayman albums
Fortuna Pop! Records albums